Pavla Kalná (née Habartová) (born November 14, 1982 in Planá) is a Czech sport shooter. She won two silver medals for the air rifle (AR40) at the ISSF World Cup series (2005 in Munich, Germany, and 2006 in Resende, Rio de Janeiro, Brazil).

Kalna represented the Czech Republic at the 2008 Summer Olympics in Beijing, where she competed in the women's 10 m air rifle, along with her teammate Kateřina Emmons, who later dominated this event by winning the gold medal. She finished only in thirty-first place by three points ahead of Uzbekistan's Elena Kuznetsova from the final attempt, for a total score of 392 targets.

References

External links
NBC 2008 Olympics profile

Czech female sport shooters
Living people
Olympic shooters of the Czech Republic
Shooters at the 2008 Summer Olympics
People from Planá
1982 births
Sportspeople from the Plzeň Region
21st-century Czech women